Many cuisines feature eggplant salads and appetizers.

Varieties

Middle East, Caucasus, Africa
Baba ghanoush ( bābā ghanūj) is a popular Levantine dish of eggplant (aubergine) mashed and mixed with various seasonings. Frequently the eggplant is baked or broiled over an open flame before peeling, so that the pulp is soft and has a smoky taste. Baba ghanoush is usually eaten as a dip with pita bread, and is sometimes added to other dishes. It is usually of an earthy light brown color. In Ethiopia, this dish is commonly known as blagadoush.

Similar to baba ghanoush is another Levantine dish mutabbal ( lit. 'spiced'), which also includes mashed cooked aubergines and tahini, and mixed with salt, pepper, olive oil, and anar seeds. Mutabbal is sometimes said to be a spicier version of baba ghanoush.

In Armenia the dish is known as mutabal. The essential ingredients in Armenian mutabal are eggplant, tahini, garlic, lemon, and onion; and most Armenians also add cumin.

Georgian badrijnis khizilala ("aubergine caviar") is made of fried and chopped eggplants. Further typical ingredients are onions, garlic, pomegranate, hot red pepper, vegetable oil and fresh green cilantro.

In Israel, the traditional version called salat ḥatzilim is made with mashed grilled aubergines, tahina, olive oil, lemon, garlic and parsley. A variation made with mayonnaise instead of tahini, called salat ḥatzilim b'mayonnaise, is also widely available.

In Morocco, a fried eggplant dish made with tomatoes, garlic, olive oil, cumin, paprika and parsley is called zaalouk.

Eggplant relish is middle eastern-north African dish. It is made of eggplant, salt, olive oil, lemon, and parsley. Several Egyptian versions of this food are made with cheese. It is commonly served hot. Eggplant relish is eaten on pita or bread.

In Iranian cuisine, eggplant is prepared into an appetizer known as kashk bademjan and Mirza Ghasemi. It is made with whey sauce (kashk).

Balkans and Eastern Europe
In Greece and Cyprus, melitzanosalata (μελιτζανοσαλάτα; "eggplant salad") is made with olive oil and lemon juice. Other ingredients typically include garlic, onion, and parsley. Sometimes spices like cumin and red pepper flakes are added. Garnishes may include feta cheese or olives. 

Malidzano, a traditional Macedonian spread, is made from puréed eggplants, sirenje cheese, walnuts and spices. It is usually served as appetizer along with bread. In other countries of Western Balkans (Serbia, Bosnia and Herzegovina, Croatia) it is prepared from green peppers and eggplant.

Salată de vinete (Eggplant salad) or simply vinete is a Romanian, Moldovan and Hungarian mashed eggplant salad made of grilled, peeled and finely chopped eggplants, sunflower oil and chopped onions. The eggplants are grilled on an open flame until they are covered with black ash crust. The crust is cleaned off and the remaining cooked eggplant is mashed with a blunt, thick wooden cleaver (knife) on a wooden platter (popular belief has it that using a metal knife will turn the eggplant flesh black, before stainless steel blades, but also because cutting through the seeds is to be avoided). The eggplant mash is mixed in a bowl, stirring continuously, with sunflower oil, chopped onions and salt. The mix is beaten vigorously. Crushed garlic and ground pepper may be added too. Instead of oil, mayonnaise can be used, although not traditionally.  A zest of lemon is added at the end and the platter is sometimes garnished with tomato slices.

A typical zakuska in Russia and Ukraine is known as baklažannaja ikra ("aubergine caviar"). Some versions add chopped tomatoes to the basic recipe. Another eggplant salad popular in Russia is called he iz baklažanov (Russian: хе из баклажанов), and it is probably influenced by Korean cuisine. Eggplant he is based on julienned (instead of mashed) cooked aubergines and other vegetables, prepared with concentrated vinegar. After adding the vinegar, it is set aside for several hours to cure before eating.

In Turkey, a similar meze is called patlıcan salatası ("eggplant salad"). It is made with grilled mashed eggplant, olive oil, lemon juice and garlic; sometimes, tahini, chopped tomato and green pepper as well. More frequently, eggplant is mixed with yoghurt, olive oil and garlic. The version with cut eggplants can be found in southern Turkey, especially in Antakya. In other varieties, called şakşuka or köpoğlu, roasted and chopped eggplants and peppers are served with garlic yogurt or tomato sauce. The latter is also a typical eggplant appetizer in Bulgaria, where it is called kyopolou. Hünkarbeğendi is another Turkish dish, which is a mutton or lamb (nowadays also veal) stew where the meat is served hot on a bed of eggplant purée. The purée also contains kaşar cheese, milk and flour.

South Asia
In Indian and Pakistani cuisine, an eggplant dish, by the name of baingan bartha, is popular especially in the regions of Punjab, Maharashtra, Bihar, Orissa and West Bengal. It is also eaten across Pakistan, as well as in Bangladesh. The dish has many names, depending on the local language (Hindi: baingan ka bharta,  begun bhôrta, Marathi: wangyacha bharit).

In the South Indian state of Tamil Nadu, the Tamils prepare kathrikai thayir kothsu, in which the eggplant is cooked, mashed and sautéed with mustard, red chili peppers, and sesame oil, after which yogurt is added to the mixture and dressed with cilantro coriander leaves. It is often eaten with an Indian flatbread (specifically roti or paratha), and is also served with rice, and/or raita (a yoghurt salad).

Kashmiris prepare a spicy and tangy dish of eggplants called  with tamarind constituting an important part of the gravy.

East and Southeast Asia
Eggplant mud (茄泥) is a Chinese recipe of steamed and mashed eggplant. It is served with dressings such as pounded garlic with soy sauce. In Sichuan cuisine many people also like to add hot peppers and cilantro. It is a common lunch dish and may be eaten with rice or rolls.

Mashed eggplant is also part of Hmong cuisine and it contains hot peppers and cilantro.

In Korea, steamed or poached strips of eggplant seasoned with garlic, toasted sesame oil and chili is a common side dish called 가지나물 (gaji namul, literally “eggplant salad.”)

Western Europe and Latin America

Caviar d'aubergine is prepared in southern France. Baked, peeled aubergine is mixed with garlic, tomato, parsley, lemon juice, and finally olive oil. It is served as an appetizer with French bread, possibly along with olive tapenade.

Caponata is a Sicilian eggplant relish made from chopped fried vegetables (mostly eggplants and peppers), seasoned with celery, olives and capers, in a sweet sour sauce. Today, caponata is typically used as a side dish or appetizer, but, since the 18th century, it has sometimes been used as a main course.

Berenjena a la vinagreta is a typical appetizer in Hispanosphere made from boiled eggplants in a vinaigrette. The eggplant is usually salted to remove moisture then boiled until soft and then placed into a vinaigrette with garlic and various herbs or spices. In Argentina the eggplants will rest in the vinaigrette, often containing plenty of oil, for several days and then is eaten as part of a picada before a meal. In Spain it can be found along other pinchos at tapas bars. In Catalonia region, eggplant is roasted and seasoned with olive oil in the dish escalivada.

Cultural references
In the 1973 Soviet film comedy Ivan Vasilievich: Back to the Future which partly takes place in the reign of Ivan the Terrible, a lavish royal banquet features several tub-sized bowls of genuine sturgeon caviar and red caviar, and a tiny golden dish of "eggplant caviar from overseas". The joke is that in 16th-century Moscow, eggplants would have been hard-to-obtain luxuries compared with Caspian Sea sturgeon caviar.

See also

 List of hors d'oeuvre
 List of eggplant dishes
 List of salads
 List of vegetable dishes

References

External links
Algerian Eggplant relish
Egyptian Eggplant relish
Salata de Vinete

Eggplant dishes
Appetizers
Arab cuisine
Argentine cuisine
Cypriot cuisine
Egyptian cuisine
Cuisine of Georgia (country)
Greek cuisine
Hungarian cuisine
Indian vegetable dishes
Iraqi cuisine
Israeli cuisine
Jordanian cuisine
Lebanese cuisine
Levantine cuisine
Mediterranean cuisine
Palestinian cuisine
Russian cuisine
Salads
Syrian cuisine
Dips (food)
Spreads (food)